Kaarto Rask (7 October 1928 – 17 March 2001) was a Finnish shot putter who competed in the 1952 Summer Olympics.

References

1928 births
2001 deaths
Finnish male shot putters
Olympic athletes of Finland
Athletes (track and field) at the 1952 Summer Olympics